Jeff Jacoby is an American sound and radio artist. His programs and artworks have been heard on NPR, PBS, Pacifica Radio and other broadcast venues, and in festivals and galleries nationwide. He is a Professor of Media Art in the Department of Broadcast and Electronic Communication Arts at San Francisco State University.

Career
Jacoby founded Living Sound Productions in 1980 (a full service production company). He was a commissioned artist for the International Festival of Arts and Ideas in New Haven, Connecticut in 2003, and has served on the faculty of Quinnipiac University and The Digital Audio Project at Real Art Ways in Hartford, CT, and on the board of The National Radio Project in Oakland, California. His ongoing projects include The Traveling Radio Show (a creative radio program), Into Sonic Space (a sound art series), and The Freedom Fries (an activist artist's collective).

Honors and awards
Jacoby has earned five major awards from The Broadcast Education Association, an Emmy in 2001 for his sound design work, Emmy nominations in 1999 and 2003, two CINE Golden Eagles, two Benjamin Franklin awards, and two Crystal Radios, among other honors.

References

External links

Jeff Jacoby's Website
Traveling Radio Show

American sound artists
San Francisco State University faculty
Living people
Quinnipiac University faculty
Year of birth missing (living people)